The year 1910 was marked, in science fiction, by the following events.

Births and deaths

Births 
 December 24 : Fritz Leiber, American writer (died 1992)

Deaths

Events

Awards 
The main science-fiction Awards known at the present time did not exist at this time.

Literary releases

Novels 
 La Mort de la Terre, by J.-H. Rosny aîné.
  Le Péril bleu, by Maurice Renard.
 The Secret of Wilhelm Storitz (in French : Le Secret de Wilhelm Storitz), by Jules Verne.

Stories collections

Short stories 
 The Eternal Adam (in French : L'Éternel Adam), by Jules Verne.
  La Journée d'un journaliste américain en 2889, by Jules Verne.

Comics

Audiovisual outputs

Movies

See also 
 1910 in science
 1909 in science fiction
 1911 in science fiction

References

science-fiction
Science fiction by year